Justice Ajay Kumar Tripathi (12 November 1957 – 2 May 2020) was an Indian judge and former Judicial Member of the Lokpal of India starting 23 March 2019. He was also the Chief Justice of Chhattisgarh High Court.

Early Life and Education 
Justice Ajay Kumar Tripathi was born on 12 November 1957. He is the grandson of Late Shri Paramanand Tripathi (prominent labour leader of Bokaro) and grandson-in-law of Late Shri Bindeshwari Dubey (former Chief Minister of undivided Bihar). Justice Tripathi completed his schooling from St. Xavier’s School, Bokaro Steel City. He graduated in Economics with Honours from the reputed Shri Ram College of Commerce (SRCC) in 1978, and went on to read law at Campus Law Centre, Delhi University. During his time at Campus Law Centre, he also served as the Joint Secretary of Delhi Law Faculty Students’ Union in the year 1978-1979.

Career

Legal Practice 
Justice Tripathi enrolled as an advocate with the Bar Council of Bihar and started practicing before the Patna High Court in 1981. His areas of practice included Service Laws, Constitutional Law, Taxation, Excise and other commercial litigation. Justice Tripathi was the Standing Counsel for the Union of India and the Income Tax Department. He also appeared on behalf of the Central Bureau of Investigation (CBI) and the Comptroller and Auditor General of India. Justice Tripathi also represented the Customs and Excise Department, Enforcement Directorate, Regional Provident Fund Commissioner and many Public Sector Undertakings including Bharat Sanchar Nigam Limited, Bharat Petroleum Corporation Limited, Inland Waterways Authority of India amongst others. He appeared in the Fodder Scam cases, alleging abuse of office by former Chief Minister of Bihar. He also served as an Additional Advocate General for the State of Bihar, and represented the State before the Patna High Court in its litigations.

Judgeship 
Justice Tripathi was elevated as an Additional Judge of the Patna High Court on 9 October 2006 and was made a permanent judge of the Patna High Court on 21 November 2007.

In 2014, SRCC awarded Justice Tripathi with the “Distinguished Alumni Award” to commemorate his professional achievements.

During his tenure at the Patna High Court, he also served as the Executive Chairman of the Bihar State Legal Services Authority (BSLSA), Patna. He contributed to varied events organised by the BSLSA, as its Executive Chairman.

As Chief Justice 
Justice Tripathi was appointed as the Chief Justice of Chhattisgarh High Court and assumed office on 7 July 2018.

On 9 July 2018, Ovation for Justice Tripathi as the 12th Chief Justice of the Chhattisgarh High Court, was held in presence of Judges of the High Court and all the office-bearers as well as members of the Bar Association.

During his tenure as Chief Justice, he was the Patron-in-Chief of the Chhattisgarh State Judicial Academy (CSJA). He played an instrumental role in the inauguration of the new building of the CSJA in 2018.

As Judicial Member Lokpal of India 
On 23 March 2019 Justice Tripathi resigned as Chief Justice of Chhattisgarh High Court after being appointed as Judicial Member in the anti-corruption ombudsman, Lokpal of India. On 27 March 2019, he took oath as a Judicial Member of the Lokpal of India.

In 2019, he was honoured by the Patna High Court Association for his appointment as a Judicial Member in the first Lokpal of India.

Notable Judgments

Education and Service Law 
In Dr. Pramod Kumar Singh v. The State of Bihar & Ors. a writ petition was filed for quashing the appointment of two vice-chancellors, namely of Veer Kunwar Singh University, Arrah and Magadh University, Bodh Gaya on the ground that the appointment made by the Chancellor of the Universities of Bihar was in violation of Section 10(2) of the Bihar Universities Act, 1976.

Before the Supreme Court’s judicial intervention in August 2013, unlike the University Grants Commission Regulation, there was no statutory requirement under earlier versions of the concerned State legislations (Bihar State Universities Act, 1976, Patna University Act, 1976) for constituting a Search Committee to shortlist a panel of likely candidates from which the Chancellor would have appointed vice-chancellors in consultation with the State government. The court held that the word ‘consultation’ in the statute implied effective and conclusive deliberation on a subject. It should be duly recorded, unlike an informal chat. Justice Tripathi judicially determined the legal force of the term ‘consultation’ under Section 10(2) pertaining to the appointment of vice-chancellors in Bihar universities. Consultation with the State is a must. Consultation with the State must be effective. Consultation also means placing of materials between the consulting and the consulted party. There has to be proper deliberations by producing all materials duly recorded to show that such exercise was carried out and there was application of mind with regard to all those persons who may be otherwise eligible. If all these elements are missing and there is no evidence in this regard in existence, then the Court will have no hesitation in recording that any appointment made, may be at the behest or at the level of the Chancellor, would be in clear breach of the requirements of Section 10(2) of the Act.There was no absolute power of the Chancellor to make an appointment to the post of Vice-Chancellor or Pro-Vice Chancellor at his level without consultation with the State within the meaning of the law. Therefore, on finding no evidence of consultation of the Chancellor with the state government, Justice Tripathi quashed the appointments. Commenting on the responsibility of the State and the Chancellor in improving the quality of higher education, Justice Tripathi observed that: This Court has the unpleasant task of reminding both the State as well as the Chancellor that the time has come to put their head together and make a determined effort to pull the higher education out of the morass it is in. They can do wee bit of service by appointing non-controversial, competent, honest persons with impeccable reputation having due diligence to run the affairs of the Universities specially on the post of Vice-Chancellors and Pro-Vice-Chancellors by adhering to the requirements of the law as envisaged under Section 10(2) of the Act and getting rid of ad hoc arrangements.

The sooner the exercise is started the better it shall be for one and all including the stakeholders who have an honest interest in the betterment of higher education, for sake of the future of the generation next. For, after all the next generation is an impatient generation who have dreams in their eyes and hopes in their heart and are racing against time to reach where they want to with the best of education. We can’t grudge them. In fact we all owe it to them.In Dr. Bimal Prasad Singh v. State of Bihar, similar instances of corruption and favour in appointments of principals in Magadh University were challenged before the Patna High Court. Justice Tripathi quashed the appointments of 12 principals of the University on the ground of irregularities in their appointments.

Property Law 
His judgment in the case of Ashalata Verma v. Bihar State Housing Board and Ors. addressed and criticised arbitrary action on the part of public authorities against a widow. The Petitioner had sought permission from the Housing Board for transferring her flat in favour of her daughter-in-law due to the Petitioner’s advancing age. In the process, the Petitioner received a notice from the Housing Board to make hefty payments for her flat, purchased in 1981. Challenging this notice before the Patna High Court, the matter was heard by the Single Judge bench comprising Justice Tripathi.

Analyzing the relevant information on record, he observed that there was absolutely no indication in the counter affidavit filed by the Housing Board that any demand after re-fixation of price was ever raised upon the Petitioner. Indications in the writ application reflected that the Housing Board had verified payments made by the Petitioner’s late husband as well as by the Petitioner, and after being duly satisfied, effected transfer of the property. The stance of the Housing Board had “only been created now” to justify an illegal demand. He stated that in absence of any notice to the Petitioner of difference in the price and “unilateral so-called revision” and there was “no occasion to allow any demand of price or interest on said amount from the petitioner at this stage.” Therefore, the claim of the Housing Board was held to be “a totally misplaced and dishonest statement”, and was rejected. Direction was issued to the Housing Board to issue the necessary permission for transfer of the property in favour of the daughter-in-law.

Reproductive Rights and Constitutional Law 
In another case of Ranichand Baiga v. State of Chhattisgarh, Chief Justice Tripathi dealt with a Public Interest Litigation brought by Petitioners belonging to primitive tribal groups who are officially designated as Particularly Vulnerable Tribal Groups (PVTG). The Petitioners challenged a circular issued by the erstwhile State of Madhya Pradesh, specifically the Department of Public Health and Family Welfare, which stated that the tribes or sub-tribes belonging to the Particularly Vulnerable Tribal Groups (PVTGs), whose names had been indicated and who inhabited the geographical areas indicated therein were barred from availing the facility of undergoing family planning procedure by tubectomy or vasectomy etc. It was held that the government circular requiring a PVTG person to obtain certificate from the Sub-Divisional Magistrate in order to undergo sterilization amounts to government intrusion and violation of the right to privacy, and was quashed being violative of Article 21 of the Constitution of  India.

Additionally, he ruled that the circulars issued by the erstwhile state of Madhya Pradesh were now applicable to the State of Chhattisgarh. The circular in question, issued by the State of Chhattisgarh, was in violation of Article 21 of the Indian Constitution as the statutory recognition of a woman’s right to make reproductive choices flowed from the inviolable guarantee under Article 21.

Equality at the Workplace 
In Punam Kumari v. The State of Bihar and Ors., a writ petition was filed by the petitioner challenging her termination from the post of an Anganwari Sevika. The dismissal report stated the reason for termination of the Petitioner was her absence on the day of an inspection. The case of the Petitioner highlighted two aspects. First, that there had been no prior complaints regarding her performance. Secondly, she needed medical advice for her pregnancy, and accordingly had applied for leave to the Mukhiya, which happened to coincide with the date of inspection. An appeal before the District Magistrate upheld the Petitioner’s dismissal, which was challenged before the Patna High Court. Justice Tripathi ruled in favour of the Petitioner and the order of termination was held to be violative of Article 14 of the Constitution of India.

He stated:An action of termination has a consequence. It is not the case of the State that whatever was done by the Petitioner on the day of inspection was a deliberate effort on her part to shirk her responsibility. Petitioner is a lady carrying pregnancy and she required medical advice for which she had given proper application to the Mukhiya concerned. She could not be expected to move office to office or person to person for authorization of leave. Getting herself attended by the doctor was more important for her. Application accepted by Mukhiya was good enough for her to go and consult the doctor.Commenting on the attitude of the concerned authorities, Justice Tripathi observed:The Court therefore opines that the Respondent authorities have been insensitive as shown above and they have taken a hyper-technical view in terminating the service of the Petitioner and that too for absence of the Petitioner for one day. The punishment of termination therefore is not only harsh and excessive but also arbitrary per se and violative of Article 14 of the Constitution of India.

Land Rights 
Anita Agrawal, Chhattisgarh & Others v. The State of Chhattisgarh, dealt with the legality and validity of a notification issued by the State Government of Chhattisgarh under Section 30(2) of the Right to Fair Compensation and Transparency in Land Acquisition, Rehabilitation and Resettlement Act, 2013. The Petitioner challenged the Notification’s validity because it had a fixed multiplier of 1 for calculating the compensation for the land acquired in the rural area throughout the state. Justice Tripathi held that the existing notification denied fair compensation to poor landowners in remote areas. Fixation of fixed multiplier of 1.10 in respect of all lands from rural area which were 25 or more kilometers away from urban area in absence of any such guideline or policy depicted colourable exercise of discretion as well as total non-application of mind and it was contrary to the Constitutional mandate under Article 14.

Directing the State to provide fair compensation to all such persons whose lands had been acquired, and a multiplier of 1.00 had been used for calculating the compensation, he commented on the State’s right to exercise power as follows:…the question is not about the power of the State Government to issue such notification, the question is the manner in which such power has been exercised which can also be levelled as mindless exercise of power since by restricting the multiplier factor to 1.00, the State is obviously trying to treat all landowners as one. This will deny to the poor land owners of the remote villages, fair compensation and rehabilitation, which is the primary object behind the new Land Acquisition Act of 2013.

Service Law 
In Koshi Project Workers’ Association and Ors. v. The State of Bihar and Ors., two writ petitions were filed challenging orders by the State Government for cancellation of promotion of the petitioners as majdoors, i.e. Class-IV permanent government employees. The judgment provides clarity on differences between a “work-charge establishment” and “permanent establishment of the State”. The Division Bench judgment upheld promotion of the Petitioners, and dismissed cancellation of the promotion notice by the State. The reasoning was that the Petitioners became permanent Government employees upon completion of one year of service in the work-charge establishment based on rules incorporated in P.W.D. Code Volume-1 by the State Government in 1949 relating to conditions of work-charge establishment including post of permanent nature. The concerned rule of the State Government stated that an employee working in the work-charge establishment for a period of 12 months in a year and for a long and indefinite period, was deemed to have become a member of the permanent establishment of the State Government.

In light of the subsequent government notification in 1950, revised condition service of work-charge establishment issued by the Government in 1949 became legislative service rules of the State Government. Additionally, this decision of the Government had not yet been cancelled or repealed by any enactment. The judgment accordingly held that the Petitioners became, “by fiction of a law, employees of the permanent establishment, although as majdoors, i.e. Class-IV employees.” There was “no just reason for holding out in the orders impugned in the writ petitions that promotions granted to the petitioners were inappropriate.”

In Bibhuti Bhusan Saha and Ors v. The Union of India & Ors., writ petitions were filed challenging orders for termination of the Petitioners as employees of National Cooperative Consumers’ Federation of India Ltd. (NCCF). The Petitioners’ service was terminated on grounds of swindling money based on an order issued by the President of the respondent organization while exercising power under Regulation 33(d) of the Bye-laws of the NCCF.

Justice Tripathi, perusing the relevant provisions, held that the charges against the Petitioners “was not an emergent situation.” They were not liable to be terminated from service by the President on the basis of an emergency provision, without the subsequent approval of the Board of Directors. He held that:The power under Regulation 33(d) is not to be usurped by the President by snatching away what is vested in a disciplinary authority which is the Managing Director in the present case. …There seems to be force in this contention of the petitioners. Further the order does not even indicate the emergent situation for exercise of power under Regulation 33(d).Hence, the order of termination in this case was quashed by the Court. Writing the judgment for himself, Justice Tripathi stated:The enthusiasm of the President in exercising such powers is not appreciated by this Court. An All India Organization having branches across the country will have some financial or disciplinary problems of this kind because of the misconduct of its employees but whether such action is an emergent situation of the kind where every other authority has to surrender its power to the President, cannot be appreciated or accepted as a cogent reason, for exercise of authority under Regulation 33(d).In Manoj Kumar v. The State of Bihar, writ applications were filed by the candidates whose names did not figure in the result of the preliminary examination declared by the Bihar Public Service Commission (BPSC) for the 52nd to 55th batch. As per facts of the case, the PT examination conducted by BPSC was not fair in terms of the questions, which were set for the examination. The master answer sheet was provided with incorrect answers, incorrect questions as well as right questions with incorrect answers. After mass protests, the Commission declared that they could not reconduct an examination of such magnitude owing to it not being an easy exercise, and delay already caused in the recruitment process for three batches. Justice Tripathi pronounced that BPSC had to re-declare results of the preliminary examination after a fresh evaluation on the basis of recommendations of the second Expert Committee, and that had to form the basis for the conduct of the mains examination as well, which was yet to be conducted. He observed that:The Court therefore comes to a considered opinion that a fairer approach to the whole problem would be by permitting BPSC to carry out a fresh evaluation of all the answer sheets on the basis of their stand emerging from the opinion of the second expert group. If such an exercise is permitted then it will amount to a fair evaluation of all the candidates without giving any unfair advantage to either successful candidates or the unsuccessful ones because they will all be tested on a common platform.Clarifying the applicability of the judgment, Justice Tripathi stated that:It is made clear that none of the successful candidates earlier declared successful on the basis of declaration of the result would be ousted from the list of such candidates who will be entitled to sit for the mains examination. If the exercise brings in more candidates within the zone of successful candidates by being permitted to sit for the mains examination, so be it, but the exercise shall not be done to the detriment of any of the successful candidates whose results have already been declared earlier.In Reeta Srivastava and Ors. v. The State of Bihar and Ors., a group of writ applications had been filed to deliberate whether the Petitioners were eligible for promotion to Subordinate Education Service from Lower Subordinate Education Service, on the basis of the qualification of a Sahityalankar, which was said to be equivalent to graduation, from an institution known as Hindi Vidyapith, Deoghar. The Court considered contentions of the State Government that the degree of Sahityalankar was not equivalent to graduation for every purpose or whether the Petitioners had a right to be promoted on the basis of such a qualification to the Subordinate Education Cadre. The Petitioners had been appointed as school teachers initially on the basis of matriculation as a minimum qualification, part of the Lower Subordinate Education Service. They later claimed eligibility for promotion to the next higher cadre of the Subordinate Education Service for which the minimum educational qualification required was graduation. The gradation list issued did not include names of the Petitioners with a Sahityalankar’s degree from Deoghar Hindi Vidyapith but included people with a graduation degree for promotion to Subordinate Education Service. Claiming this as a ground for discrimination, the Petitioners approached the Patna High Court for a judicial direction with regard to their right for such promotion. Justice Tripathi observed that:There is overbearing evidence that voluntary organization like Hindi Vidyapith, Deoghar has a role in promotion of the national language i.e. Hindi and the degrees or diploma which are offered by them had a limited objective behind it. Therefore, such degrees cannot be raised to the level of graduation as if the said voluntary organization is a university having all its attributes even though there is no recognition by any statutory body such as U.G.C. etc.Saroj Kumar and Ors. v. The State of Bihar and Ors. dealt with the appointment of the Petitioners as Panchayat Teachers in light of their persisting contracts as Panchayat Shiksha Mitra under the Central Government Scheme, Sarva Shiksha Abhiyan. The notified rule of the Bihar Government relating to appointment of Bihar Panchayat Primary Teachers (Employment and Service Conditions) Rules in 2006 stated that all those persons whose contract subsisted as on 01.07.2006, by a deeming fiction created in Rule 20 became a Panchayat Teacher, a permanent engagement under the State. The terms and conditions of service of such individuals were now going to be governed by the 2006 Rules. Various allegations came to be made against Panchayats about the manner in which contracts for the post of Panchayat Shiksha Mitra were initiated.

An issue was raised against selection of the Petitioners leading to annulment of their appointments by the Teacher Employment Appellate Tribunal, Supaul constituted by the State Government, on the ground that their engagement as a Panchayat Shiksha Mitra was not done properly.

Justice Tripathi elucidated that the status of the Petitioners as “Panchayat Teacher cannot be taken away by such adjudication by reopening the issue of an illegal engagement of Panchayat Shiksha Mitra after so many years, especially when such persons got benefit of the status by virtue of a statute or rule which has never been challenged to be arbitrary or violative of any constitutional provision.”

He concluded that “the removal of any person, who had been made a Panchayat Teacher after 1.7.2006, can only be made within the parameters of the 2006 Rules. Any action taken thereafter against their engagement as a Shiksha Mitra will no longer affect their right to continue on the post of a Panchayat Teacher, even if it was on the basis of engagement as a Panchayat Shiksha Mitra which was a contractual engagement…”

Similarly, in the case of Md. Najmuddin v. State of Bihar, Justice Tripathi upheld the right of Petitioners of receiving equal pay who pleaded discrimination in the matter of grant of pay parity and allowances, which were available to similarly situated ministerial employees of Rajendra Agriculture University, Pusa, Samastipur. In this case, Justice Tripathi held that the State and the University Syndicate must work jointly for the welfare of employees, and extend the benefit across the board to every employee instead of discriminating between the employees who had approached the Court and those “who have silently suffered the discrimination.” The Court also recognised that issuance of such a notification where for the same set of work and responsibility, identical set of employees were getting two different remuneration and pay scale, which was neither a healthy position for good administration nor met the standards of Articles 14 and 16 of the Constitution of India.

In Bishhat Ram Sahu v. State of Chhattisgarh, Through The Secretary, Forest Department, (C.G.) & Ors. the Appellant was terminated from the service of a forest guard on the pretext that he did not fulfil the eligibility criteria to be appointed. Justice Tripathi, while addressing the question of whether the appellant had committed fraud or not, held that he was appointed based on prior experience and not on the requirement for qualification of being 8th Pass. He pronounced that the respondents’ argument that a minimum 8th pass was required for the appointment was incorrect. It was not an instance of appointment per se, but rather a regularisation of the Appellant. Since, the Appellant along with similarly situated persons, had worked for a long period, earned him the consideration for regularisation. The State based on the recommendation of the competent authority had made the Appellant a Forest Officer. Justice Tripathi opined that the charges brought against the Appellant, which became the reason for his dismissal after more than 22 years of service, are a misuse, if not an abuse of power.

Industrial Law 
The judgment in Deepak Paints (P) Ltd. and Ors. v. The State of Bihar and Ors. dealt with a writ petition challenging the exercising power of the Managing Director under section 6(2) of the Bihar Industrial Area Development Act (BIADA), 1974. In this case, the Managing Director directed a large-scale cancellation of lease and repossession of the land, plant and the machinery including those allotted to the Petitioner company. The contention on behalf of the Respondents was that the aforementioned action was under the lease agreement between the parties. The Court unequivocally stated that “a bare perusal of the orders of termination…are under the purported exercise of powers under Section 6(2) of the BIADA Act read with the necessary amendments of 1992 as well as the 1981 Rules.”

Justice Tripathi restored lease rights of the industrial area available to the Petitioner company. He further made an observation that the Managing Director had the power to exercise under the ambit of a statute and the Act but not under the lease agreement. The power of cancellation under Section 6(2) of the Act was vested in the “Authority” i.e. the Board of Directors of which the Managing Director was only a part.

The judgement in conclusion stated that the steps taken by the Managing Director or his subordinates in the direction of cancellation of lease, repossession, resettlement or auctioning was an illegal exercise of power.

Contribution to Legal Education 
Justice Tripathi was a member of the General and Academic Councils of Chanakya National Law University (CNLU) at Patna. He also served as a member of the Academic Council of the National Law School of India University (NLSIU), Bangalore. He was a Special Invitee to the Education Committee, Bar Council of India.

During his tenure as the Chief Justice of Hon’ble Chhattisgarh High Court, Justice Tripathi served as the Chancellor of the Hidayatullah National Law University (HNLU), Raipur.

Personal life 
Justice Tripathi was an ardent golfer. He served as the President of Patna Golf Club between the years 2007-2009. Justice Tripathi, both participated and won many amateur tournaments. On invitation from the Governor of Jammu & Kashmir, Justice Tripathi led Bihar in inter-state golf tournaments at the Royal Springs Golf Club of Jammu & Kashmir.

He is survived by his wife and three daughters.

Death 
In April 2020, Justice Tripathi contracted COVID-19 during the first wave of the COVID-19 pandemic in India and was placed on a ventilator in critical condition. He died on 2 May 2020, from a cardiac arrest at the AIIMS Trauma Centre.<ref name="times-india-heart-attack">{{cite news |last1=Staff |title=Lokpal member Ajay Kumar Tripathi dies due to cardiac arrest after testing positive for coronavirus |url=https://timesofindia.indiatimes.com/india/lokpal-member-ajay-kumar-tripathi-dies-due-to-coronavirus/articleshow/75510973.cms |access-date=30 May 2020 |work=The Times of India |date=3 May 2020 |language=en |quote=Lokphal member Ajay Kumar Tripathi, who had tested positive for the coronavirus, died on Saturday after suffering a cardiac arrest at the AIIMS Trauma Centre, official sources said.}}</ref>

 Legacy 
On 22 August 2022, the Justice Ajay Kumar Tripathi Foundation was founded in the memory of Justice Ajay Kumar Tripathi. The Foundation, a non-profit organization, aims to promote legal thought and discourse towards judicial education, legal reform, judicial impact assessment, and judicial conscientiousness.

The Foundation was inaugurated on 27 November 2022, at the India International Centre, New Delhi. The occasion was also marked by the 1st Justice Ajay Kumar Tripathi Memorial Lecture on the subject “The Idea of India and the Role of the Judiciary Therein.''”

The “Justice Ajay Kumar Tripathi Memorial Under-19 Trophy Cricket Championship” has been launched in association with Bokaro District Cricket Association and Jharkhand Cricket Board. The event will commence from 28 December 2022 in Bokaro Steel City.

References

1957 births
2020 deaths
Delhi University alumni
People from Bihar
Judges of the Patna High Court
Chief Justices of Chhattisgarh High Court
20th-century Indian judges
20th-century Indian lawyers
21st-century Indian lawyers
21st-century Indian judges
Deaths from the COVID-19 pandemic in India